Marcel Laurens (born 21 June 1952) is a Belgian former racing cyclist. He finished in last place in the 1983 Tour de France.

Major results

1973
3rd Kattekoers
1974
3rd Schaal Sels
1976
1st Heist-op-den-Berg
7th Grote Prijs Jef Scherens
1977
1st Ronde van Limburg
2nd Heist-op-den-Berg
1978
1st Brabantse Pijl
3rd Road race, National Road Championships
7th Kuurne-Brussels-Kuurne
1979
1st Grote Prijs Jef Scherens
2nd Heist-op-den-Berg
3rd Schaal Sels
6th Bordeaux-Paris
10th Brabantse Pijl
1980
1st Stage 3 Volta a Catalunya
1st Heist-op-den-Berg
1st GP du Tournaisis
1982
1st Heist-op-den-Berg
1983
8th GP de Fourmies

References

External links

1952 births
Living people
Belgian male cyclists
Sportspeople from Mechelen
Cyclists from Antwerp Province